Esra Bilgiç (born 14 October 1992) is a Turkish actress. She is best known for portraying the role of Halime Hatun in the Turkish historical adventure television series Diriliş: Ertuğrul from 2014 to 2018. Among other roles, she starred in the 2020–2021 crime drama Ramo.

Career
Bilgiç was born on 14 October 1992 in Ankara, Turkey. In 2014, she made her television debut in the Turkish historical adventure series Diriliş: Ertuğrul on TRT 1, alongside co-actors Engin Düzyatan and Hülya Darcan. The story of the series is centred around the life of Ertuğrul Bey, the father of Ottoman dynasty founder Osman Bey. Bilgiç played the role of Halime Hatun, mother of Osman, but left in 2018, due to changes in the new season.

She also appeared in  alongside Tolgahan Sayışman and Hazal Subaşı. In 2020, Bilgiç appeared in a leading role in the Turkish film Adanış Kutsal Kavga with co-star İsmail Filiz. She is the female lead in the Turkish crime-drama television series Ramo with co-star Murat Yıldırım. Outside of Turkey, Bilgiç has seen wide popularity in Pakistan, leading her to become the brand ambassador of the Pakistani cricket team Peshawar Zalmi, consumer electronics company QMobile and mobile network provider Jazz in 2020.

From September 2021 until February 2022, she shared the lead role in the period drama  with actor Uğur Güneş. The series was canceled after 16 episodes due to poor ratings.

In March 2022, Bilgiç appeared in a Victoria's Secret commercial for the "Love Cloud" collection.

Personal life
In 2014, Bilgiç began dating a professional Turkish footballer, Gökhan Töre. The couple got married on 21 October 2017, and divorced on 17 June 2019. Turkish President Recep Tayyip Erdoğan and First Lady Emine Erdoğan were present at Bilgiç's wedding.

In August 2021, after the Taliban takeover of Afghanistan, Bilgiç  posted retweets with hashtags including "I don’t want refugees in my country" and "I don’t want Afghans here." She later removed the retweets. Dawn described the original tweets as "hateful".

Filmography

Awards and nominations

Bilgiç has won several awards. Some of them are:

References

External links
 
 

1992 births
Living people
21st-century Turkish actresses
Actresses from Ankara
People from Ankara
Turkish film actresses
Turkish television actresses
Association footballers' wives and girlfriends